Târnăviţa may refer to several places in Romania:

 Târnăvița, a village in Hălmăgel Commune, Arad County
 Târnăvița, a village in Brănișca Commune, Hunedoara County

See also 
 Târnava (disambiguation)